Gregory Haanstad is an American attorney who is serving as the United States attorney for the Eastern District of Wisconsin. In 2022, he was confirmed to the position by the United States Senate after being nominated by President Joe Biden.

Education

Haanstad received a Bachelor of Science from the University of Wisconsin, La Crosse in 1995 and a Juris Doctor, cum laude, from the University of Wisconsin Law School in 2000.

Legal career

Haanstad served as a law clerk for magistrate judge William E. Callahan Jr. on the United States District Court for the Eastern District of Wisconsin from 2000 to 2002. Since 2002, he has served as an Assistant United States Attorney in the United States Attorney's Office for the Eastern District of Wisconsin.  He had served as first assistant to U.S. attorney James Santelle since 2010.

U.S. attorney for the Eastern District of Wisconsin

Acting U.S. attorney from 2016 to 2018 

He was appointed to the post on an acting basis on August 1, 2015 and served in that capacity until 2016. He was previously United States attorney for the Eastern District of Wisconsin from 2016 to 2018.

Nomination as U.S. attorney under Biden 

In May 2021, his name was among five lawyers who was submitted to the White House by senators Tammy Baldwin and Ron Johnson. On June 6, 2022, President Joe Biden nominated Haanstad to be the United States attorney for the Eastern District of Wisconsin. On July 28, 2022, his nomination was reported out of the Senate Judiciary Committee by a voice vote. On September 13, 2022, his nomination was confirmed in the United States Senate by voice vote. He was sworn in on September 19, 2022.

References

Living people
Year of birth missing (living people)
Place of birth missing (living people)
20th-century American lawyers
21st-century American lawyers
Assistant United States Attorneys
United States Attorneys for the Eastern District of Wisconsin
University of Wisconsin–La Crosse alumni
University of Wisconsin Law School alumni